Vagueness is a problem in semantics, metaphysics and philosophical logic. Vague may also refer to:

 Vagueness doctrine, a constitutional doctrine which prohibits unclearly written laws in the United States.
 Vague (club), a club night in Leeds, England in the 1990s
 "Vague", a song by the industrial rock band Orgy from their 2004 album Punk Statik Paranoia
 Rhys Vague (born 1996), American basketball player
 Vera Vague, a character played by the American actor Barbara Jo Allen (1906–1974)
"Vague", a 1994 song by the indie rock band Blonde Redhead

See also
 Våge (disambiguation)